Satya Pal Singh is an Indian politician and member of the Bharatiya Janata Party. Singh is a member of the Madhya Pradesh Legislative Assembly from the Sumawali constituency in Morena district.

References 

People from Morena district
Bharatiya Janata Party politicians from Madhya Pradesh
Madhya Pradesh MLAs 2013–2018
Living people
Year of birth missing (living people)